Igor Aleksandrovich Shtukin (born 11 December 1985) is a former Russian professional footballer.

Club career
He played 3 games in the UEFA Intertoto Cup 2004 for FC Shinnik Yaroslavl.

He played two seasons in the Russian Football National League for FC Avangard Kursk and FC Zvezda Irkutsk.

External links
 
 

1985 births
Footballers from Yaroslavl
Living people
Russian footballers
Association football midfielders
FC Shinnik Yaroslavl players
FC Zvezda Irkutsk players
FC Avangard Kursk players
FC Sheksna Cherepovets players
FC Spartak Kostroma players
FC Tekstilshchik Ivanovo players